Lotus FM (formerly, Radio Lotus) is a South African national radio station based in Durban, loosely similar to the BBC Asian Network in the United Kingdom, that caters for the needs of the Indian South African community. It combines a mix of Indian music, news, current affairs, interviews and entertainment. Lotus FM targets South African Indians between the ages of 25-34 (core) and 35-49 (secondary) in the LSM 7-10 segment.

Lotus FM has occasionally been the subject of complaints, with people of South Indian descent claiming that the station's broadcasts favour Hindi music over Tamil music.

The Lotus FM studio complex is based at the SABC in Durban, next to the famous Kingsmead Cricket stadium.

Disc jockeys 
The following is a list of On-Air Personalities who present and produce shows on the station (including weekends)

Alan Chetty
Alan Khan
Althaf Suleman
Ashit Desai
Aksoy Turkish
Avin Moorley
Byron David
Deon Chetty 
Diresh Sinath
Enrico Pillay
Julian Lurie
Jailoshini Naidoo
Josh Michael Reddiar 
Karusha Chetty
Mala Lutchmanan
Manick Thor
Mihir Sharmin Govindasami
Navitha Gajraj
Nicholas Pillay
O'Neil Nair
Pravina Maharaj
Raeesa Mahomed

Rakesh Ramdhin
Ravi Govender
Ryan Naicker
Sareshan Pillay
Shirdika Pillai
Shaastra Nagasur
Sudhisha Naidoo
Suresh Harilal
Sanobar Khan
Sahendran Kandasami 
'n Protea Petalje
Tharshey Naidoo
Varshan Sookhun
Veena Lutchman

Frequencies 
The station broadcasts in FM on the following frequencies throughout South Africa

Listenership Figures

References

External links
Lotus FM Website
Lotus FM Facebook Page
SAARF Website
Sentech Website

Radio stations in Durban
Radio stations established in 1983